The Ferreres Aqueduct, also known as the Pont del Diable, is an ancient bridge, part of the Roman aqueduct built to supply water to the ancient city of Tarraco, today Tarragona in Catalonia, Spain. The bridge is located 4 kilometers north of the city and it is part of the Archaeological Ensemble of Tarraco (listed as a UNESCO's World Heritage Site since 2000).

Description 
The Tarraco aqueduct took water from the Francolí river, 15 kilometers north of Tarragona. It probably dates from the time of the emperor Augustus.

Les Ferreres Aqueduct is composed of two levels of arches: the upper section has 25 arches, and the lower one has 11. All arches have the same diameter of 20 Roman feet (5.9m) with a variation of 15 cm. The distance between centres of the pillars is 26 Roman feet (7.95m).

See also 
Roman bridges
List of Roman aqueduct bridges

References

External links

Les Ferreres Aqueduct
Archaeological Ensemble of Tárraco - UNESCO's World Heritage Sites Website

World Heritage Sites in Catalonia
Archaeological sites in Catalonia
Roman aqueducts outside Rome
Roman bridges in Catalonia
Bridges completed in the 1st century
Aqueducts in Spain
Water supply and sanitation in Catalonia